The list of shipwrecks in July 1889 includes ships sunk, foundered, grounded, or otherwise lost during July 1889.

1 July

2 July

5 July

6 July

7 July

11 July

12 July

15 July

16 July

17 July

19 July

20 July

21 July

23 July

24 July

25 July

29 July

Unknown date

References

1889-07
Maritime incidents in July 1889